Play the Game, also known as Let's Play the Game, was one of the earliest game shows to be broadcast over an American television network, and the first known example of a television panel show. In 1941-42, CBS aired an early game show, CBS Television Quiz.

Broadcast history
Play the Game was essentially a televised version of the parlor game charades. The show was hosted by Dr. Harvey Zorbaugh, professor of educational sociology at New York University. The show aired over the DuMont Television Network on Tuesdays from 8 to 8:30 pm ET from September 24, 1946, to December 17, 1946. The show also aired on ABC from August 20, 1948, to November 6, 1948, in primetime. A previous version of the program had been broadcast locally in New York City on WNBT Channel 1 (the predecessor to WNBC-TV) in 1941.

Although broadcast on DuMont, the program was actually produced by ABC in order for that network to develop experienced crews in anticipation of its own entry into television broadcasting; in this sense, it was the first ABC television series.  WABC-TV Channel 7 subsequently broadcast later episodes of the program to the New York City market during 1948.

Celebrity panelists during the DuMont Network run included Ireene Wicker, Ray Knight, and Will Mullin. There were also audience participation segments during which viewers were invited to call in their guesses to the charades being presented.

British Version
A British version (albeit as a pure panel game) aired on BBC-tv from 4 August 1947 to sometime in 1950, and was later adapted for children from 1951 to 1952. Hosts of this version included Cleland Finn, Sally Rogers, and Robert MacDermot.

Episode status
As with most DuMont programs, no episodes of this show are known to exist in the UCLA Film and Television Archive or other collections. The status of the ABC version is unknown, but is likely also lost.

See also
List of programs broadcast by the DuMont Television Network
List of surviving DuMont Television Network broadcasts
1946-47 United States network television schedule
1948-49 United States network television schedule
On Stage, Everybody - ABC-produced TV series which aired on DuMont station WABD in 1945
Let's Play Reporter - ABC-produced TV series which aired on DuMont station WABD in 1946

References

Bibliography
David Weinstein, The Forgotten Network: DuMont and the Birth of American Television (Philadelphia: Temple University Press, 2004) 
Alex McNeil, Total Television, Fourth edition (New York: Penguin Books, 1980) 
Tim Brooks and Earle Marsh, The Complete Directory to Prime Time Network TV Shows, Third edition (New York: Ballantine Books, 1964)

External links 
 
 DuMont Television Network Historical Website: Appendix One: Programs (M-Z)

American Broadcasting Company original programming
DuMont Television Network original programming
1940s American game shows
1946 American television series debuts
1948 American television series endings
Black-and-white American television shows
English-language television shows
Lost television shows
Television game shows with incorrect disambiguation
1940s British game shows
1950s British game shows
BBC television game shows
Black-and-white British television shows